Jack is a 2015 Austrian thriller film about serial killer Jack Unterweger, directed by Elisabeth Scharang. It was screened in the Contemporary World Cinema section of the 2015 Toronto International Film Festival.

Plot
Jack Unterweger, who grew up in a red-light district and who was previously known to the police for petty theft, is arrested for the murder of a woman, found guilty and sentenced to life in prison. While incarcerated, he begins to write, which attracts a following of several intellectuals. After about 15 years, he is granted parole, in great part due to the advocacy of his famous supporters. He soon becomes a heartthrob present at events, and a guest in television programs. He writes his first successful novel. He appears to be the model of rehabilitation after prison.

But after several unsolved murders of prostitutes, he attracts the attention of police investigators again. In 1994, Unterweger is charged with the crimes, again, and is sentenced to live without the possibility of parole. He commits suicide on the night of his conviction.

Cast
 Johannes Krisch as Jack Unterweger
 Corinna Harfouch as Susanne Sönnmann
 Birgit Minichmayr as Marlies Haum
 Sarah Viktoria Frick as Charlotte
 Paulus Manker as psychologist Ziehofer
 Valerie Pachner as Marlene

References

External links
 

2015 films
2015 thriller films
Austrian thriller films
2010s German-language films